Petrolina Social Futebol Clube, also known simply as Petrolina, is a Brazilian football club founded in 1998 in Petrolina, Pernambuco. The first appearance in the Série A1 (top level of Pernambuco Football) was in 2002. The biggest competitor of Petrolina is the 1º de Maio Esporte Clube, also a club of Petrolina.

Honours

Pernambuco Championship 2nd level: 2001

Appearances in competitions

 Campeonato Pernambucano: 2002, 2003, 2004, 2005, 2008

Association football clubs established in 1998
Football clubs in Pernambuco
1998 establishments in Brazil
Petrolina